Glebovskoye is a rural locality (a selo) in Seletskoye Rural Settlement, Suzdalsky District, Vladimir Oblast, Russia. The population was 142 as of 2010. There are 6 streets.

Geography 
Glebovskoye is located on the Kamenka River, 5 km east of Suzdal (the district's administrative centre) by road. Suzdal is the nearest rural locality.

References 

Rural localities in Suzdalsky District